Robert 'Rob' Muzio (born 1965), is a retired male cyclist who competed for England.

Cycling career
He represented England and competed in the 4,000 metres individual pursuit and won a bronze medal in the 4,000 metres team pursuit event, with Chris Boardman, Gary Coltman, Adrian Adgar and Jon Walshaw, at the 1986 Commonwealth Games in Edinburgh, Scotland.

He was a professional from 1987-1988.

References

1965 births
English male cyclists
Commonwealth Games medallists in cycling
Commonwealth Games bronze medallists for England
Cyclists at the 1986 Commonwealth Games
Living people
Medallists at the 1986 Commonwealth Games